Bruno Major (born 15 July 1988) is a British singer-songwriter and guitarist. His debut album A Song for Every Moon was released in 2017.

Career
On 21 January 2014, Major released the four-song EP Live on Virgin Records, where he worked with producer Ethan Johns before being released from the label. In August 2016, Major announced that he would write, record and release one song every month for a year, which resulted in the 12-song R&B album A Song for Every Moon, released on 3 November 2017.

In November 2017, he went on The Trio Tour in six cities in the US and Europe. In 2018, he embarked on a tour across North America, followed by a UK arena tour opening for Sam Smith, a headline tour of Europe and the UK, and a headline tour of the United States. He appeared on The Late Late Show on 22 February 2018, in his first television performance, performing his song "Easily". In June 2018, he performed at his first US festival, Bonnaroo Music Festival. In September and October, he went on an Asia tour for the first time.

On 19 February 2019, Major released a revised version of "Old Fashioned" from his "Live" EP. Following that, he released a string of five more singles over the year, until 20 March 2020, when Major announced his second full length album, To Let a Good Thing Die, to be released on 5 June 2020. The album featured producer Finneas as a co-writer for "The Most Beautiful Thing".

"Easily" was certified gold in Australia in July 2021.
His 2020 single "Nothing" reached number 63 on the Irish Singles Chart in November 2021.

Personal life
Major is originally from Northampton, England. He moved to London in 2011. Originally a jazz musician, he began his career as a session guitarist at age 16, for artists including Lalah Hathaway. Major also studied a degree in jazz at Leeds Conservatoire (formally Leeds College of Music).

He is the older brother of Dominic 'Dot' Major of London Grammar.

Discography

Albums
 Live (EP, 2014)
 A Song for Every Moon (2017)
 To Let a Good Thing Die (2020)

Appears on
 "Shelter" by M. J. Cole feat. Bruno Major (2017)

Writing, producing

References 

1988 births
Living people
British male singer-songwriters
English pop guitarists
English jazz guitarists
People from Northampton
English male guitarists
English record producers